Aymestrey is a village and civil parish in north-western Herefordshire, England. The population of this civil parish, including the hamlet of Yatton, at the 2011 Census was 351.

Location 
It is located on the A4110 road, about 7 miles north-west of Leominster and 8 miles south-west of the historic market town of Ludlow, in south Shropshire.  The village is on the River Lugg.

Amenities and history 
Aymestrey is home to several homes and cottages, the church dedicated to St John the Baptist and St Alkmund, a village hall and a pub or Inn: The Riverside Inn, situated next to River Lugg just off the main road.

The Mortimer Trail waymarked recreational walk passes through the village.

In 1987, the Aymestrey burial, an Early Bronze Age, beaker cist, was discovered during gravel working. It has since been recreated at Leominster Museum.

In fiction 
Aymestrey is featured in the supernatural crime novel Foxglove Summer by Ben Aaronovitch, where it is described as being "less a village than a diorama of the last six hundred years of English vernacular architecture stretched along either side of the road.”

References

External links

 http://www.Aymestrey.org - Aymestrey Community Website
 https://web.archive.org/web/20170704022837/http://www.theriversideinn.org/ - The Riverside Inn at Aymestrey
 Aymestrey on Google Maps: Hybrid, Map
 

Villages in Herefordshire